This is a list of regions of Tanzania by Human Development Index based on data for the year 2021.

References 

Tanzania
Human Development Index
Regions